Łukawica  (Lukavytsia) is a village in the administrative district of Gmina Narol, within Lubaczów County, Subcarpathian Voivodeship, in south-eastern Poland.

The village has a population of 280.

References

Villages in Lubaczów County